Nicki Moore, née Webber, is the incoming Meakem Smith Director of Athletics and Physical Education for Cornell University. She currently serves as the athletic director at Colgate University. She previously served as an assistant athletic director at the University of Oklahoma from 2004 to 2010, as an associate athletic director at the University of Oklahoma from 2010 to 2015, and as an associate athletic director at the University of North Carolina at Chapel Hill from 2015 to 2018. Moore attended college at the University of Missouri, where she competed on the school's track and field team. Moore was named the first female athletic director at Cornell University on November 30, 2022.

References

External links
 
Colgate Raiders bio
North Carolina Tar Heels bio

Living people
Colgate Raiders athletic directors
University of Missouri alumni
University of California, Davis alumni
Missouri Tigers women's track and field athletes
1974 births
Women college athletic directors in the United States